Lynch Hotel is a historic hotel located at Newton Hook in Columbia County, New York.  It was built about 1900 and is a 2-story, five-by-four-bay, frame building with a gable roof in the Queen Anne style. Also on the property is a small barn or carriage house.  It has been a single family home since about 1935.

It was added to the National Register of Historic Places in 2005.  The neighboring James Lynch House was listed in 2009.

References

Hotel buildings on the National Register of Historic Places in New York (state)
Queen Anne architecture in New York (state)
Hotel buildings completed in 1900
Buildings and structures in Columbia County, New York
National Register of Historic Places in Columbia County, New York